Carl Hagberg may refer to:

 Carl August Hagberg (1810–1864), Swedish linguist and translator
 Carl Peter Hagberg (1778–1841), Swedish minister and orator